Wiley J. Peck (born September 15, 1957) is a retired American professional basketball player. Born in Montgomery, Alabama, he was a 6'7" and 220 lb shooting guard and played college basketball at Mississippi State University. He had a brief career in the National Basketball Association (NBA) in 1979-80.

Peck was selected 19th overall by the San Antonio Spurs in the 1979 NBA Draft. After one season with the Spurs, he was selected by the Dallas Mavericks in the 1980 expansion draft.

Notes

External links
NBA stats @ basketballreference.com

1957 births
Living people
African-American basketball players
American men's basketball players
Basketball players from Montgomery, Alabama
Dallas Mavericks expansion draft picks
Mississippi State Bulldogs men's basketball players
San Antonio Spurs draft picks
San Antonio Spurs players
Shooting guards
21st-century African-American people
20th-century African-American sportspeople